Harrison Smith (born February 2, 1989) is an American football safety for the Minnesota Vikings of the National Football League (NFL). He played college football at Notre Dame and was drafted by the Vikings in the first round of the 2012 NFL Draft with the 29th overall pick.

In 2017, Smith was graded the third-best player in the NFL by Pro Football Focus. His season grade of 98.8 was also the highest among safeties in Pro Football Focus history. He was named to his third straight Pro Bowl on January 22, 2018 and was named first-team All-Pro. He followed with a 4th consecutive Pro Bowl in 2019 and second-team All-Pro.

High school career
Smith, who was named by his parents after actor Harrison Ford, attended Knoxville Catholic High School in Knoxville, Tennessee. In his senior season, he gained 1,340 yards rushing to go with 19 touchdowns, caught 23 passes for 453 yards and six touchdowns, and also made 61 tackles, two tackles for loss, two interceptions, and caused two fumbles on defense. He was named Gatorade Football Player of the Year in Tennessee in 2006.

In addition to football, Smith also played basketball and ran track. In track, he competed primarily as a jumper. He won the state meet in the high jump 1.98 meters (6.5 ft) and the decathlon, scoring 6,230 points. He had a career-best leap of 2.03 meters (6.8 ft) in the high jump.

Considered a four-star recruit by Rivals.com, he was listed as the No. 25 athlete in the nation. Many scouts believed he could play offense or defense in college. He chose Notre Dame over offers from Tennessee, Auburn, Stanford, and Alabama.

College career
After red-shirting as a freshman in 2007, he emerged as a star in 2008. He began his career at linebacker. In his first year, he started 9 games and recorded 57 tackles, which included 8.5 tackles for loss, and 3.5 sacks. As a junior in 2009, he started six games at strong safety, then strongside linebacker for the final six games. He recorded 69 tackles including 6.5 tackles for loss. In 2010, as a senior, he played strong safety where he recorded 93 tackles including a team-high seven interceptions. In 2011, he was accepted to a graduate program at Notre Dame allowing him to play another season. In his final year in 2011, serving as team captain, he played in and started in all 13 games. He recorded 90 tackles including 3 tackles for loss.

College statistics

Professional career
Coming out of Notre Dame, Smith was projected by the majority of analysts to be a first round draft selection. He was ranked the second best strong safety, behind Alabama's Mark Barron, and the 46th best prospect by NFLDraftScout.com. He was invited to attend the 2012 NFL Combine as a free safety and completed the entire workout and every positional drill. Smith was satisfied enough with his combine performance that he chose to only partake in positional drills at Notre Dame's Pro Day. He received positive reviews from analysts and scouts for his size, athletic ability, play recognition, intelligence, tackling ability, reaction time, consistency, and production. He mainly received negative reviews on his man to man coverage ability.

2012
On April 26, 2012, the Minnesota Vikings drafted Smith in the first round (29th overall) of the 2012 NFL Draft after trading up with the Baltimore Ravens. On May 31, 2012, the Minnesota Vikings signed Smith to a four-year, $7.13 million contract with $5.78 million guaranteed and a signing bonus of $3.63 million.

Entering training camp, Smith competed against Jamarca Sanford and Andrew Sendejo for the starting free safety spot. Smith was named the starting free safety to begin the regular season. He made his professional regular season debut and first career start in the Vikings' season opener against the Jacksonville Jaguars. He finished the 26–23 victory with seven combined tackles. During the Week 5 matchup against the Tennessee Titans, Smith was ejected for moving an official out of the way, but the Vikings still got the 30–7 win. In Week 7 against the Arizona Cardinals, Smith recorded six combined tackles, a pass deflection, and his first career interception off a pass thrown by John Skelton, which he returned for a 31-yard touchdown to seal the Vikings' 21-14 victory. In Week 8 against the Tampa Bay Buccaneers, he made a season-high 13 combined tackles as the Vikings lost 36–17. In Week 13 against the Green Bay Packers, Smith recorded 11 combined tackles and intercepted a pass thrown by Aaron Rodgers as the Vikings lost 23-14. In Week 14 against the Chicago Bears, he recorded seven total tackles and intercepted a pass thrown by Jay Cutler that he returned for a 52-yard touchdown in a 21–14 victory, marking his second touchdown of the season. In Week 15 against the St. Louis Rams, Smith had a season-high nine solo tackles and an assisted tackle during a 36–22 win. In a Week 16 matchup against the Houston Texans, he decided seven solo tackles and made his first career sack on Matt Schaub, as the Vikings won 23–6.

He finished his rookie season with 104 combined tackles, one sack, three interceptions, and two touchdowns.

2013
He returned as the starting free safety the following season. In the season-opener against the Detroit Lions, Smith made a season-high ten combined tackles and deflected a pass as the Vikings lost 34-24. The following week, he recorded eight solo tackles and intercepted Jay Cutler for his first of the season. The Minnesota Vikings went on to lose to the Chicago Bears 31-30. In a Week 3 contest against the Cleveland Browns, Smith racked up five solo tackles and intercepted Brian Hoyer in a 31-27 loss to the Browns. On October 18, 2013, Smith was placed on injured-reserve after suffering an injury to his left foot during a Week 6 loss to the Carolina Panthers. On December 14, 2013, after missing 8 games, Smith was activated to the 53-man roster. The next day, he played in his first game since returning and made eight combined tackles in a 48-30 victory over the Philadelphia Eagles. Smith started only seven games in the 2013 season due to his foot injury and made 58 combined tackles and two interceptions.

2014
He resumed as the starting free safety under new head coach Mike Zimmer. In the season-opener against the St. Louis Rams, Smith made two solo tackles, a pass deflection, a sack, and intercepted a pass by Shaun Hill, returning it for an 81-yard touchdown in a 34-6 victory. In Week 4 against the Atlanta Falcons, Smith intercepted a pass thrown by Matt Ryan in a 41-28 win. The following week, in a Thursday Night game against the Green Bay Packers, Smith intercepted a pass thrown by Matt Flynn in a 42-10 loss. On November 2, 2014, he recorded a season-high ten solo tackles in a 29-26 win over the Washington Redskins. In a Week 11 contest, Smith recorded three solo tackles, a pass deflection, and intercepted a pass thrown by Jay Cutler in a 21-13 loss to the Chicago Bears. The next game, he deflected a pass, made five solo tackles, and assisted on five tackles, tying his season-high of ten combined tackles in a 24-21 loss to the Packers. In Week 16 against the Miami Dolphins, Smith intercepted a pass thrown by Ryan Tannehill in a 37-35 loss. He started all 16 games and finished his first year under head coach Mike Zimmer with 92 combined tackles, nine deflected passes, three sacks, five interceptions, and a touchdown.

2015
On May 3, 2015, the Minnesota Vikings picked up the fifth-year option on his rookie contract that paid him $5.28 million for 2016.

In the season opener, he recorded a season-high nine combined tackles in a 20-3 loss to the San Francisco 49ers. In Week 2, Smith made a season-high six solo tackles in a 26-16 win over the Detroit Lions. In Week 4, Smith made three combined tackles and intercepted a pass thrown by Peyton Manning in a 23-20 loss to the Denver Broncos, marking Smith's first interception of the season. In Week 16, Smith racked up five combined tackles and intercepted a pass thrown by Eli Manning that he returned for a 35-yard touchdown in the Vikings' 49-17 win over the New York Giants. He set a Minnesota Vikings' franchise record with four interceptions returned for touchdowns in a career. Smith started 13 games for the Vikings in the 2015 season and missed Weeks 12, 14, and 15 due to a knee injury. He finished the season with 66 combined tackles, 1.5 sacks, two interceptions, and a touchdown.

On January 31, 2016, Smith played in his first Pro Bowl, as an alternate for the injured Earl Thomas. He was ranked 73rd on the NFL Top 100 Players of 2016.

2016
On June 6, 2016, Smith signed a five-year, $51.25 million contract extension with the Vikings that included $28.57 million guaranteed and a signing bonus of $10 million.

In the Vikings' season-opener against the Tennessee Titans, he made eight total tackles in a 25–16 victory. On September 25, 2016, Smith recorded seven combined tackles and sacked Cam Newton for his first of the season, in a 22–10 win against the Carolina Panthers. In a Week 11 matchup against the Arizona Cardinals, Smith recorded a season-high ten combined tackles and sacked Carson Palmer in a 30–24 victory. Smith missed Weeks 14 and 15 with a high ankle sprain that was initially thought to possibly be a season-ending injury that required surgery. On December 24, 2016, he returned in a 38–25 loss to the Green Bay Packers and made four solo tackles. He finished the season with 91 tackles, two sacks, and two deflected passes in 14 starts. This was the first season in his career he did not record an interception.

On December 20, 2016, the NFL announced that Smith and fellow Vikings Xavier Rhodes and Cordarrelle Patterson had been voted to the 2017 NFL Pro Bowl. This was his second consecutive Pro Bowl but first as a first-team member. He was ranked 74th on the NFL Top 100 Players of 2017.

2017
Smith would have what would be considered the best season of his career in 2017. In Week 3, Smith recorded his first interception of the season off a pass thrown by Jameis Winston in a 34-17 win over the Buccaneers. Two weeks later, in a Monday Night game against the Bears, Smith intercepted rookie quarterback Mitch Trubisky to seal a 20-17 win. Against the Packers the following week, Smith sacked Brett Hundley 1.5 times and intercepted a pass thrown by Hundley in a 23-10 win. In a rematch with the Packers in Week 16, Smith recorded two more interceptions against Hundley in a 16-0 win, earning him NFC Defensive Player of the Week.

Smith was graded the third-best player in the NFL by Pro Football Focus. His season grade of 98.8 was also the highest among safeties in Pro Football Focus history. He was named to his third straight Pro Bowl on January 22, 2018 and was named first-team All-Pro. He was also nominated for NFL Defensive Player of the Year. He was ranked 46th on the NFL Top 100 Players of 2018.

2018
In Week 1, Smith intercepted a pass thrown by Jimmy Garoppolo, while also recording a sack and a touchdown-saving fumble recovery off running back Alfred Morris to go along with 7 tackles in the team's 24-16 win over the San Francisco 49ers, earning him NFC Defensive Player of the Week. In week 5 against the Philadelphia Eagles, Smith had 4 tackles and sealed the game with a big hit late in the 4th quarter to prevent a third-down conversion. In Week 7 against the New York Jets, Smith intercepted a pass thrown by Sam Darnold, while also recording 4 tackles and 2 passes defended in the Vikings' 37-17 win. In the following game against the New Orleans Saints, Smith intercepted a pass thrown by Drew Brees, which was Brees' first interception of the season, but the Vikings would lose 30-20. After recording 84 tackles, three sacks, and three interceptions on the season, Smith was selected to a 4th straight Pro Bowl as well as being named a Second-team All-Pro. Despite Smith's stellar season, however, the Vikings finished second in the NFC North and missed out on the playoffs with an 8-7-1 record.

2019
In Week 3 against the Oakland Raiders, Smith recorded his first interception of the season off Derek Carr in the 34–14 win.
In Week 14 against the Detroit Lions, Smith intercepted a pass thrown by rookie quarterback David Blough that was intended for wide receiver Kenny Golladay in the 20–7 win. In Week 15 against the Los Angeles Chargers, Smith intercepted a pass thrown by Philip Rivers and recovered a fumble forced by Danielle Hunter on running back Melvin Gordon during the 39–10 win. In Week 16 against the Green Bay Packers, Smith forced a fumble on wide receiver Davante Adams that was recovered by teammate Eric Kendricks during a 23-10 loss. He finished the year with 85 tackles, a sack, and three interceptions, while being selected to his fifth straight Pro Bowl.

The Vikings finished second in the NFC North with a 10-6 record, but qualified for the postseason as the NFC's sixth seed. In the Vikings' 26-20 overtime road upset of the Saints in the Wild Card Round, Smith recorded 11 tackles. In the Divisional Round, which the Vikings lost 27-10 against the eventual NFC champion 49ers, Smith recorded 8 tackles.

2020
In Week 3 against the Tennessee Titans, Smith recorded his first interception of the season off Ryan Tannehill during the 31–30 loss. In Week 4 against the Houston Texans, Smith was ejected after initiating a helmet to helmet hit on tight end Jordan Akins. The Vikings would go on to win 31-23. In Week 9 against the Detroit Lions, Smith recorded his second interception of the season off Chase Daniel in the 34-20 win.
In Week 10 against the Chicago Bears on Monday Night Football, Smith recorded another interception, this time off a pass thrown by Nick Foles during the 19–13 win.
In Week 13 against the Jacksonville Jaguars, Smith intercepted a pass thrown by Mike Glennon in overtime to set up the Vikings’ game winning field goal during the 27–24 win.
In Week 17 against the Detroit Lions, Smith recorded his fifth interception of the season (tying his single season career high) off a pass thrown by Matthew Stafford during the 37–35 win.

2021
On August 29, 2021, Smith signed a four-year contract extension with the Vikings worth $64 million. To start the season, Smith recorded a sack on Joe Burrow in a 27-24 overtime loss to the Cincinnati Bengals. On November 7, 2021, Smith was placed on the Reserve/COVID-19 list after a positive test, which resulted in him missing the following two games as an unvaccinated player. He was activated on November 17, 2021.

After being activated from the Reserve/COVID list, Smith posted either a sack or an interception in three games between Weeks 11-14. This included a sack on Aaron Rodgers in a 34-31 win over the Green Bay Packers, an interception off Jimmy Garoppolo in a 34-26 loss to the San Francisco 49ers, and a sack on Ben Roethlisberger in a 36-28 win over the Pittsburgh Steelers.

Despite only recording one interception on the season, Smith recorded a new career high in tackles with 114 and tied his career high in sacks with three.

NFL career statistics

References

External links
 
 Notre Dame Fighting Irish bio
 Minnesota Vikings bio

1989 births
Living people
American football safeties
Notre Dame Fighting Irish football players
Minnesota Vikings players
Unconferenced Pro Bowl players
Players of American football from Knoxville, Tennessee
National Conference Pro Bowl players